Coman may refer to:

People 
A surname or given name of either Celtic, Anglo-Saxon or Cuman origin:
Anghei Coman, Romanian sprint canoeist who competed from the early 1980s
Carolyn Coman, writer of children's books, living in South Hampton, New Hampshire
Coman Goggins, former Dublin footballer
Coman mac Faelchon, (fl. 550) founder, abbot and bishop of Roscommon
Coman of Kinvara, medieval Irish saint
Dănuț Coman (born 1979), Romanian goalkeeper
Dragoș Coman (born 1980), international freestyle swimmer from Romania
Florinel Coman (born 1998), Romanian professional footballer
Gabriela Coman (born 1959), Romanian volleyball player
Gigel Coman (born 1978), Romanian football player
Gilly Coman (1960–2010), British-based actress
Herbert Coman (1920–2009), American football player and coach
Ioan Coman (born 1908–date of death unknown), Romanian cross-country skier
Ion Coman (born 1981), Romanian football player who currently plays as a striker
Jamie Coman (born 1962), Australian equestrian
Katharine Coman (1857–1915), social activist and distinguished economist
Kingsley Coman (born 1996), French footballer
Marius Coman (born 1996), Romanian professional footballer
Peter Coman (born 1943), former cricketer who played three One Day Internationals
Mike Coman (born 1987), New Zealand professional rugby player
Robert Grimes Coman, Commodore in the United States Navy
Simion Coman (born 1890), Romanian Brigadier-General during World War II
Thomas Coman, President of the New York City Board of Aldermen from 1868 to 1871
 Cornel Coman (1936–1981), Romanian actor
 Dan Coman (born 1975), Romanian author
 Ion Coman (born 1926), Romanian politician
 Marian Coman (born 1977), Romanian poet and journalist
 Narcis Coman (born 1946), Romanian footballer
 Otilia Valeria Coman (born 1942), birth name of the Romanian poet and civil rights activist Ana Blandiana

Places 
Mount Coman, prominent isolated mountain west of the Playfair Mountains in Antarctica
Coman, a village in Sănduleni Commune, Bacău County, Romania

Sport 
Coman tie break, an alternative USTA tie break in Tennis (see Tennis score)

See also 
 Comana (disambiguation)
 Comanca (disambiguation)
 Comănești (disambiguation)
 Comănescu (surname)

Romanian-language surnames